Adi Litia Qalirea Cakobau (c. 1941 – 8 October 2019) was a Bau high Fijian Chief   and political leader. Cakobau, the daughter of Ratu Sir George Cakobau, who was Fiji's Governor-General from 1973 to 1983, was appointed to the Senate in 2001 as one of nine nominees of the Fijian government. She held this post till 2006, when her elder sister, Adi Samanunu Cakobau-Talakuli was appointed to the Senate.

Prior to her appointment to the Senate, she had previously held Cabinet office as Minister for Women, a post to which she was appointed in 1987.

Her brother, Ratu George Cakobau, was also a Senator from 2001 to 2006, but was nominated by the Great Council of Chiefs rather than the government, as she was. She died at her home in Lautoka in October 2019 at the age of 78.

References

1940s births
2019 deaths
Fijian chiefs
I-Taukei Fijian members of the Senate (Fiji)
Tui Kaba
Soqosoqo Duavata ni Lewenivanua politicians
Soqosoqo ni Vakavulewa ni Taukei politicians
Politicians from Bau (island)